Dysstroma formosa, the Formosa carpet moth, is a species of geometrid moth in the family Geometridae. It is found in North America.

The MONA or Hodges number for Dysstroma formosa is 7191.

References

Further reading

External links

 

Cidariini
Articles created by Qbugbot
Moths described in 1896